David Vincent Ragone (born May 16, 1930) is an American metallurgist, famous for the Ragone chart.  Ragone was the third President of Case Western Reserve University.

Ragone was born in New York City, New York, on May 16, 1930.

Ragone studied metallurgy at the Massachusetts Institute of Technology (MIT), where he earned a Bachelor of Science degree in 1951 and a Master of Science degree in 1952. In 1953, he graduated with a Ph.D.  In the same year, he began teaching at the University of Michigan as an associate professor and later as a professor. He specialized in the fields of thermodynamics, chemical engineering, and metallurgy.

From 1962 to 1967 he worked with General Atomics, a subsidiary of the armaments company General Dynamics. There he was chairman of the department for material research. His research involved material investigations for the development of a gas-cooled nuclear reactor.

Ragone continued to teach metallurgy at a research university, this time at Carnegie Mellon University in Pittsburgh, Pennsylvania. After being a dean of the Thayer School of Engineering at Dartmouth College from 1970 to 1972, he eventually returned to the University of Michigan, where he was appointed Dean of Engineering.

From 1980 to 1987, Ragone served as President of Case Western Reserve University, a research university in the Cleveland, Ohio. In 1988, he moved back to his alma mater, MIT, where he taught thermodynamics and physical chemistry until 1998.

Writings

 Thermodynamics of Materials (1995)

References

External links
 Case Western Reserve University bio

1930 births
Carnegie Mellon University faculty
Case Western Reserve University faculty
Dartmouth College faculty
University of Michigan faculty
Massachusetts Institute of Technology alumni
MIT School of Engineering faculty
Living people
Presidents of Case Western Reserve University